The 2008 Delaware gubernatorial election took place on November 4, 2008, coinciding with the United States presidential election. Democratic state Treasurer Jack Markell defeated Republican William Swain Lee in a landslide, succeeding incumbent Ruth Ann Minner, also a Democrat, who was prevented from running for a third term.

As of 2008, Democrats had controlled the Delaware governorship for 16 years. In an upset, state Treasurer Jack Markell defeated Lieutenant Governor John Carney by 51 to 49% for the Democratic nomination on September 9. Carney was considered the favorite. The Republican nominee was former state Superior Court Judge William Swain "Bill" Lee, defeating airline pilot Michael Protrack. Lee was the Republican nominee for governor in 2004, and lost to Minner by a narrow margin.

The race received more attention with the potential elevation of U.S. Senator Joe Biden as Barack Obama's choice as his Vice President of the United States. Election of a Republican governor would assist the party by proxy gaining an additional seat in the US Senate. Senator Biden resigned his seat in the United States Senate on January 15, 2009, and Ted Kaufman was appointed by Governor Minner to the vacant seat. Kaufman had previously served as Senator Biden's Chief of Staff during his tenure in the United States Senate.

Democratic primary

Candidates
John Carney, Lieutenant Governor of Delaware
Jack Markell, Delaware State Treasurer

Results

Republican primary

Candidates
William Swain Lee, former Delaware Superior Court justice and nominee for governor in 2004
Michael Protack, airline pilot

Results

Blue Enigma Party
Jeffrey Brown, bartender and party founder

General election

Predictions

Polling

Results

See also
Delaware gubernatorial election, 2004
 Sarah McBride, a Markell staffer

References

External links
Delaware Commissioner of Elections
Delaware Governor candidates at Project Vote Smart
Delaware Governor race from OurCampaigns.com
Delaware Governor race from 2008 Race Tracker
Campaign contributions from Follow the Money
Official campaign websites (archived)
John Carney, Democratic candidate
Bill Lee, Republican candidate
Jack Markell, Democratic candidate

2008
2008 United States gubernatorial elections

Gubernatorial